Mirza Kamal al-Din Shah Hossein Isfahani, better simply known as Mirza Shah Hossein (میرزا شاه حسین), was an Iranian nobleman, who served as the vakil (vicegerent) and vizier of the Safavid Empire. He also briefly held the post of commander of the empire's musketeer corps (tofangchi-aghasi).

Biography 
A native of Isfahan, Mirza Shah originally served as an architect, but was in 1503 appointed as the personal vizier of the powerful Qizilbash magnate Durmish Khan Shamlu, who had recently been appointed as the governor of Mirza Shah's native city. Mirza Shah was appointed as vakil and vizier in 1514 after the Battle of Chaldiran, which had a damaging impact on the health of Safavid king Ismail I, who withdrew from affairs of the state and began heavily drinking. The appointment of Mirza Shah to the vakil office was because he had after the battle found Ismail's favorite wife who was lost in Azerbaijan. In 1516, Ismail I also appointed Mirza Shah Hossein as commander of the musketeer corps (tofangchi-aghasi).

Mirza Shah used the absence of the king as an opportunity to expand his authority. Furthermore, Mirza Shah also became a close friend with Ismail and was alongside him during his period of drinking. This made Mirza Shah gain influence over the king himself. In 1521, Mirza Shah chose to confront his former master, Durmish Khan Shamlu, managing to send him far away from the Safavid court—to Herat in Khorasan, where he was forced to serve as its governor.

However, Mirza Shah Hossein outsmarted himself in the end, and as a result was in 14 April 1523 murdered at the hands of furious Qizilbash members. He was succeeded by Jalal al-Din Mohammad Tabrizi.

References

Sources 
 
 
 
 

Iranian architects
Grand viziers of the Safavid Empire
Politicians from Isfahan
Assassinated Iranian people
16th-century Iranian politicians
15th-century births
1523 deaths
Tofangchi-aghasi
Vakils of Safavid Iran
16th-century people of Safavid Iran
Military personnel from Isfahan